Ametropodidae is a family of mayflies in the order Ephemeroptera. There are at least three genera and three described species in Ametropodidae.

Genera
These three genera belong to the family Ametropodidae:
 Ametropus Albarda, 1878 i c g b
 Brevitibia Demoulin, 1968 g
 Palaeometropus Sinitshenkova, 2000 g
Data sources: i = ITIS, c = Catalogue of Life, g = GBIF, b = Bugguide.net

References

Further reading

 
 
 
 
 
 
 
 
 
 
 

Mayflies
Insect families